Olakunle "Kay" Banjo (born December 3, 1992) is an American soccer player who currently plays for Maryland Bobcats FC.

Career

Youth and college 
Banjo played four years of college soccer, three year at Towson University, before moving to University of Maryland, Baltimore County in 2014. Banjo finished his degree at Towson after the university's soccer program was dissolved and enrolled at UMBC as a graduate student. In 2013, Banjo scored two goals for the Screaming Eagles of the Maryland International Soccer League as the team defeated the Maryland Bays 4–2 in the Rowland Cup final, Maryland's qualifying tournament for the Lamar Hunt U.S. Open Cup. The victory put the club within two wins of the tournament proper. The team defeated the Aegean Hawks 1–0 in the next round to put them within one win of the tournament. However, the Screaming Eagles were determined to have fielded multiple players who were not cleared by the USSF and the victory was given to the Hawks prior to the semi-final match.

Professional 
On January 15, 2015, Banjo was selected 38th overall in the 2015 MLS SuperDraft by Vancouver Whitecaps FC. However, he was not signed by the club.

Banjo signed his first professional contract on November 23, 2016, joining United Soccer League side Pittsburgh Riverhounds ahead of their 2017 season. He made his first professional career start on April 13, 2017 against Saint Louis FC. He scored his first career goal in the fifth minute of the match, an eventual 1–2 defeat.

On February 1, 2021, Banjo became the first professional signing by Maryland Bobcats FC, having previously played for the club at the amateur level in the United Premier Soccer League.

Personal 
Banjo is a dual citizen of the United States and Nigeria.

References

External links 
 
 
 NISA player profile

1992 births
Living people
American sportspeople of Nigerian descent
American people of Yoruba descent
American soccer players
Association football forwards
People from Upper Marlboro, Maryland
Pittsburgh Riverhounds SC players
Maryland Bobcats FC players
Soccer players from Maryland
Sportspeople from the Washington metropolitan area
Towson Tigers men's soccer players
UMBC Retrievers men's soccer players
USL Championship players
United Premier Soccer League players
National Independent Soccer Association players
Vancouver Whitecaps FC draft picks
Yoruba sportspeople